Control area may refer to:
 Control area (aviation), a volume of controlled airspace that exists in the vicinity of an airport.
 Control area, a balancing area within an electrical grid.